Xavier "Xavi" Pascual i Vives, commonly known as Xavi Pascual, (born 9 September 1972) is a Spanish professional basketball coach who is the head coach for Zenit Saint Petersburg of the VTB United League and EuroLeague. On 9 May 2010 he became the youngest head coach to win the EuroLeague championship (only counting the Euroleague Basketball Company era, since the year 2000), and soon after, he also won the EuroLeague Coach of the Year Award.

Coaching career

Early years
The first team Pascual coached was Gavà (1990–91). Other teams that he coached early in his career were: Cornellà, Santfeliuenc, Olesa, and Aracena.

FC Barcelona
In the 2004–05 season, Pascual moved to FC Barcelona, where he became the head coach of FC Barcelona Bàsquet B, the club's Liga EBA (Spanish 4th Division) reserve team.

In the following, 2005–06 season, he became the assistant head coach of the Spanish 1st Division team of FC Barcelona. After the team and then head coach Duško Ivanović parted ways in 2008, Pascual became the club's head coach. On 21 September 2012, Pascual extended his contract with Barcelona, until the end of 2014–15 season. On 3 February 2015, he extended his contract with Barcelona, until the end of the 2016–17 season. 

After the 2015–16 season, in which Barcelona failed to win the Spanish ACB League, and was eliminated in the EuroLeague's quarterfinal playoffs, Pascual was fired.

Panathinaikos
On 22 October 2016, Pascual signed a three-year contract to be the head coach of the Greek Basket League team Panathinaikos. In domestic competition, Pascual led the Greens to back-to-back Greek League titles, in 2017 and 2018, and was named the league's best coach for both seasons. On 20 December 2018 Panathinaikos dismissed Pascual after he had spent two seasons with the club, bringing the Greens to the Turkish Airlines EuroLeague Playoffs in both, but failing to bring them back to the Final Four.

Coaching record

EuroLeague

|- 
| align="left" rowspan=9|FC Barcelona
| align="left" |2007–08
| 9 || 4 || 5 ||  || align="center"|Eliminated in Quarterfinal Playoffs
|- 
| align="left" |2008–09
| 23 || 18 || 5 ||  || align="center"|Won in 3rd place game
|- ! style="background:#FDE910;"
| align="left" |2009–10
| 22 || 20 || 2 ||  || align="center"|Won EuroLeague Championship
|- 
| align="left" |2010–11
| 20 || 14 || 6 ||  || align="center"|Eliminated in Quarterfinal Playoffs
|- 
| align="left" |2011–12
| 21 || 19 || 2 ||  || align="center"|Won in 3rd place game
|- 
| align="left" |2012–13
| 31 || 25 || 6 ||  || align="center"|Lost in 3rd place game
|- 
| align="left" |2013–14
| 29 || 23 || 6 ||  || align="center"|Won in 3rd place game
|- 
| align="left" |2014–15
| 28 || 21 || 7 ||  || align="center"|Eliminated in Quarterfinal Playoffs
|- 
| align="left" |2015–16
| 29 || 16 || 13 ||  || align="center"|Eliminated in Quarterfinal Playoffs
|- 
| align="left" rowspan=3|Panathinaikos
| align="left" |2016–17
| 30 || 19 || 11 ||  || align="center"|Eliminated in Quarterfinal Playoffs
|- 
| align="left" |2017–18
| 34 || 20 || 14 ||  || align="center"|Eliminated in Quarterfinal Playoffs
|- 
| align="left" |2018–19
| 13 || 6 || 7 ||  || align="center"|Fired
|- 
| align="left" rowspan=1|Zenit Saint Petersburg
| align="left" |2020–21
| 39 || 22 || 17 ||  || align="center"|Eliminated in Quarterfinal Playoffs
|-class="sortbottom"
| align="center" colspan=2|Career||330||229||101||||

Honours

CB Aracena
 LEB 2 (Spanish 3rd Division) (1): 2002–03
 Lliga Catalana LEB (Catalan 2nd Division) (1): 2003–04

FC Barcelona
Liga ACB (Spanish League) (4): 2008–09, 2010–11, 2011–12, 2013–14
Spanish Cup (3): 2009–10, 2010–11, 2012–13
EuroLeague (1): 2009–10
Spanish Supercup (4): 2009, 2010, 2011, 2015
Lliga Catalana (Catalan League) (7): 2009, 2010, 2011, 2012, 2013, 2014, 2015

Panathinaikos
Greek League (2): 2016–17, 2017-18
Greek Cup (1): 2016–17

Individual
 4× Spanish League Coach of the Year: 2009–10, 2010–11, 2011–12, 2015–16
 3× AEEB Spanish Coach of the Year: 2009, 2010, 2011
 EuroLeague Coach of the Year: 2009–10
 2× Greek League Best Coach: 2016–17, 2017-18

See also
 List of EuroLeague-winning head coaches

References

External links
 Xavi Pascual  at acb.com 
 Xavi Pascual at euroleague.net

1972 births
Living people
BC Zenit Saint Petersburg coaches
Catalan basketball coaches
EuroLeague-winning coaches
FC Barcelona Bàsquet coaches
Liga ACB head coaches
Panathinaikos B.C. coaches
Sportspeople from L'Hospitalet de Llobregat
Spanish basketball coaches